Alethea Boon is an athlete from New Zealand. She represented New Zealand in artistic gymnastics at the 1998 Commonwealth Games and the 2002 Commonwealth Games, and in weightlifting at the 2018 Commonwealth Games.

Boon was born in Suva, Fiji, and grew up in Auckland, New Zealand. She competed in artistic gymnastics, attending two Commonwealth Games, and studied exercise science at Brigham Young University while continuing to compete while at university. She retired at the age of 24.

In 2010, Boon suffered a blockage in the arteries of her lungs after surgery and she was initially unable to walk due to lack of breath. She began to compete in CrossFit, participating at the 2016 and 2017 Crossfit Games, and in 2013 she began competing in Olympic-style weightlifting. She achieved two 2nd-place finishes in the Australian Weightlifting Open, and the 2017 Oceania Weightlifting Championships. In 2018, she competed in the Women's 58 kg event at the Commonwealth Games on the Gold Coast.

CrossFit Games results

References

External links

1984 births
Living people
CrossFit athletes
Commonwealth Games competitors for New Zealand
Gymnasts at the 1998 Commonwealth Games
Gymnasts at the 2002 Commonwealth Games
Weightlifters at the 2018 Commonwealth Games
Fijian emigrants to New Zealand
People educated at Westlake Girls High School
20th-century New Zealand women
21st-century New Zealand women